The National Union Committee was a nationalist reformist political organization formed in Bahrain in 1954 (originally named the Higher Executive Committee). The committee was formed by reformists in response to sectarian clashes between Sunni and Shia members of the population. Its foundations were laid in the journal, Sawt al-Bahrain, which was founded and published by these reformist figures. The original aims were to push for an elected popular assembly, a codified system of civil and criminal law, the establishment of an appellate court, the right to form trade unions, an end to British colonial influence (through the removal of Charles Belgrave), and an end to sectarianism.

The original committee was made up of four Sunni representatives and four Shi'i representatives. The members were:
 Abdul Rahman Al Bakir - Secretary
 Abdulaziz Al Shamlan
 Ibrahim Fakhro
 Ibrahim bin Mousa
 Abdali Al Alaiwat
 Sayyid Ali Kamaluddin
 Shaikh Abdullah Abudeeb
 Shaikh Mohsin al Tajir

One of the early members of the committee was Ali Sayyar, who joined in 1956 and would become a veteran journalist in Bahrain.

Arrest and deportation
The NUC successfully orchestrated a number of general strikes and demonstrations in the country to push for its demands. In March 1956, British Foreign Secretary Selwyn Lloyd was visiting Bahrain. Crowds of protesters lined the streets to shout anti-British slogans and threw sand at stones at the Foreign Secretary's entourage. A number of crew members, including a stewardess, were left injured. Abdulrahman Al Bakir, the secretary of the NUC, was among the leaders of the demonstrations. He was asked to leave the country after the incident for an extended stay abroad, and departed to Egypt. Al Bakir returned to Bahrain September 1956.

In October 1956, the NUC called for strikes and demonstrations against the Israeli-Anglo-French attack on Egypt in the Suez Campaign. This led to days of violence in Bahrain. In November, the ruler Shaikh Salman bin Hamad Al Khalifa, ordered the arrest of the NUC leaders, accusing Al Bakir, Al Shamlan and Aliwat of attempting to take his life. A specially set up court in Budaiya made up of three judges (all members of the ruling Al Khalifa family) tried the men and found them guilty. They were sentenced to 14 years at a prison located outside of Bahrain, in Saint Helena.

In June 1961 the three prisoners were released from Saint Helena after a successful habeas corpus action, and were later paid financial compensation from the British government.

See also
March Intifada
National Liberation Front - Bahrain
Popular Front for the Liberation of Bahrain

References

 Debates in British House of Commons
 Miriam Joyce. (Autumn 2000). The Bahraini three on St. Helena, 1956-1961 The Middle East Journal 54 (4); p. 613
 Falah al-Mdaires. (Spring 2002). Shi'ism and Political Protest in Bahrain Domes 11 (1); p. 20
 Abdulhadi Khalaf. (1998). Contentious politics in Bahrain: From ethnic to national and vice versa].
 Fuad Ishaq Khuri. (1980). Tribe and state in Bahrain: The transformation of social and political authority in an Arab state. 
 Fred H. Lawson. (1989). Bahrain: The Modernization of Autocracy. 
 Charles Belgrave. (1960). Personal Column, (London: Hutchinson)
 Abdul Rahman Al Bakir. (1965) [https://www.scribd.com/doc/3471119/- Mina al-bahrayn ila al-manfaa, 'sant halaneh', [From Prison to Exile 'Saint Helene'], al-Hayat Library Publications, Beirut.
 A. de L. Rush. (1991). Bahrain: The Ruling Family of Al Khalifah, Archive Editions.
 Hussain Al Baharna. Readings in the trial of the National Union Committee leadership, (Arabic)
 Abdulnabi Al Ekri. (Feb 2005). The National Union Committee in foreign writings.
 Bahrain Nationalist Movement. Encyclopedia of the Modern Middle East and North Africa.
 National Liberation Front (Bahrain). Encyclopedia of the Modern Middle East and North Africa.

Bahraini democracy movements
Political history of Bahrain
Political parties in Bahrain